Events from the year 1575 in France

Incumbents
 Monarch – Henry III

Events

1 to 7 March – Battle of Dormans
21 June – Battle of Besançon

Births

Full date missing
Jean Châtel, assassin (died 1594)
Henri de Schomberg, Marshall of France (died 1632)

Deaths

Full date missing
Gaspard de Saulx, military leader (born 1509)
Simon Vigor, Catholic bishop (born c.1515)
Claude of France, Duchess consort of Lorraine (born 1547)

See also

References

1570s in France